The 2017–18 Eliteserien is the 51st season of the Eliteserien, Norway's premier handball league.

Teams
A total of 12 teams will be participating in the 2017/18 edition of Eliteserien. Of these, 10 teams qualified directly from the 2016/17 season and the top two teams from the First Division, Molde Elite and Fredrikstad BK.

Regular season

Standings

Results
In the table below the home teams are listed on the left and the away teams along the top.

Championship playoffs

Quarterfinals

Vipers Kristiansand won 74–40 on aggregate.

Larvik HK won 73–45 on aggregate.

Storhamar Håndball Elite won 58–53 on aggregate.

Byåsen Elite won 56–54 on aggregate.

Bracket
Highest ranked team from the regular season selects the opponent. The remaining two highest ranked teams from the regular season can not meet in the semifinals.

Semifinals

Vipers Kristiansand won 58–48 on aggregate.

Larvik HK won 68–54 on aggregate.

Finals

Vipers Kristiansand won the final 69–50 on aggregate.

Top goalscorers

Regular season

Playoffs

Overall

Relegation playoff

Rælingen HK won 47–45 on aggregate and were promoted to Eliteserien, Sola HK were relegated to First Division.

References

External links
Official website (in Norwegian)

2017–18 domestic handball leagues
2017 in Norwegian women's sport
2018 in Norwegian women's sport